Usas Escarpment is an expansive but discontinuous north-facing escarpment in Marie Byrd Land, Antarctica. The position of the escarpment coincides with the north slopes of the Flood Range, Ames Range, McCuddin Mountains, and the eastern peaks of Mount Galla, Mount Aldaz and Benes Peak. The escarpment was observed by members of the United States Antarctic Service, 1939–41, and in ensuing scientific reports was referred to as 76th Parallel Escarpment. The approved name is an acronym for the discovery expedition.

References

Landforms of Marie Byrd Land
Escarpments of Antarctica